System Group Co. (SG) (Hemkaran Sistem) aka Hamkaran System is Iran's largest private software development company. The company provides enterprise software and support to businesses of all sizes located across the country. 
System Group is a conglomerate of 58 companies and has served over 53000 clients since 1987. The company was listed as one of the top 500 companies in Iran.

History
System Group was founded in 1987 by Mahmoud Nazzari, Shahriar Rahimi, and Homayoun Hariri.
The company launched its financial accounting software in 1991.
In 2011, the company set a new milestone by becoming the first software company in Iran to be listed in the stock market.
System Group, officially Introduced the 3rd generation of its products at 2012.

References

External links
Iranian Newspaper - Mahmoud Nazzari's Interview with Donyaye Eghtesad NewsPaper
Tehran Securities Exchange Technology Management Co - System Group's Profile in OTC Market of Iran
Sepidarsystem - Systemgroup's solutions for small businesses

Software companies of Iran